Heinz-Harald Frentzen (born 18 May 1967) is a German former racing driver. He competed in multiple disciplines including Sportscars, Formula One and DTM. He had his most success in Formula One, entering over 150 Grands Prix and winning three.

Early career
Frentzen was born on 18 May 1967 in the West German city of Mönchengladbach (North Rhine-Westphalia) to Heinrich-Harald Frentzen (1933–2012), a German entrepreneur and his Spanish wife Angela Lladosa (1937–2020). He has two sisters (Sylvia, a theologian, Sonja, a teacher) and two half-sisters (Samantha, a former student, and Nicole-Nadine). His family was connected to motorsport; his father raced between 1950 and 1957. Frentzen's parents divorced when he was eight years old and his father subsequently married Mexican-born Arazelli while Angela returned to Spain.

Frentzen began karting at the age of twelve, after his father brought him his first kart, and made an extraordinarily successful start. In 1981, aged fourteen, Frentzen won the German Junior Kart Championship. Two years later, Frentzen entered the CIK Asia Pacific Championships in Australia driving a Dino although he did not finish. In 1984, he finished runner-up in the 100cc class. He was funded and supported by his father—a funeral director—who also acted as both team boss and head mechanic.

In 1985, Frentzen moved into car racing by entering the German Formula Ford 2000 series. After two seasons in Formula Ford he was runner-up in the 1987 series, despite not participating in all races. Frentzen progressed to German Formula Opel Lotus in 1988 in the Junior Team of former Formula One driver Jochen Mass, who had been impressed by Frentzen's performances in Formula Ford. Frentzen was champion of the German series in his first year and his teammate Marco Werner finished third in the championship. He also participated in the Formula Opel Lotus Euroseries, where he finished 6th in the championship, scoring 56 points.

The next step was the German Formula 3 Championship in 1989, where Frentzen competed against many future stars including Michael Schumacher and Karl Wendlinger. At the time, there was a big push by Bernie Ecclestone to have a German driver in the Formula One World Championship, so the ONS (the German National Motorsports committee) decided to support both Frentzen and Schumacher. The ONS put up the reward of a Formula One test to the driver who first would take a victory in a Formula 3 race. This ultimately ended up being Schumacher, in a controversial race at Zeltweg, Austria in which Frentzen claimed Schumacher had forced him off the track. However, Schumacher did not get the Formula One test drive anyway; Karl Wendlinger won the German Formula 3 Championship and Frentzen became joint runner-up with Schumacher (the two finishing on identical points totals).

In 1990, Frentzen entered the International Formula 3000 series driving for Eddie Jordan Racing and was partnered by Eddie Irvine. Frentzen finished the season 16th in the championship, scoring 3 points. In the same year, he also participated in the World Sports Prototype Championship driving a Mercedes-Benz C11 scoring one podium and six points. In 1991, Frentzen continued to drive in International Formula 3000, moving to Vortex Motorsport and scored five points in that year's series.
 
In the early 1990s, Frentzen was in a relationship with Corinna Betsch. After their relationship ended, Corinna later married fellow Formula 1 driver Michael Schumacher. In 1999 Frentzen married Tanja Nigge. Together they have three children.

Formula One

Sauber (1994–1996)

In 1994 Frentzen was given a Formula One drive by Peter Sauber in a Mercedes powered car, as teammate to Wendlinger. The following year in the now Ford-powered Sauber he got his first podium finish at the Italian Grand Prix and ended the year 9th in the Drivers Championship. However, the 1996 Sauber was unreliable, with many races ending in retirements and Frentzen dropping down the order, though he was one of only four drivers running at the end of that year's chaotic, rain-soaked Monaco Grand Prix. The race was won by Olivier Panis.

Williams (1997–1998)

For the 1997 season, Frentzen replaced 1996 champion Damon Hill at the Williams-Renault team. At the first race of the season, Frentzen took the lead at the first corner and remained there until his first pit stop. He was running second late in the race when a brake disc exploded, throwing him off the circuit and into retirement. He took his first win at the fourth race of the year at San Marino. Frentzen followed this with his first pole position of his career at the following round in Monaco, but did not finish the race. After inconsistency marked the first half of the season, Frentzen finished the second half of season with six points scoring performances including five consecutive podiums. Despite eight front-row starts and seven podium finishes, Frentzen was generally out-performed by team-mate Jacques Villeneuve, out-qualifying the French-Canadian only four times during the season. Frentzen was unable to secure another victory and finished third in the driver's championship standings with 42 points to teammate Villeneuve's 81. He would be elevated to second after the disqualification of Michael Schumacher.

Renault discontinued factory support for the Williams engines in 1998. Williams also lost chief designer Adrian Newey to McLaren during the off-season. Consequently the team suffered a loss of performance compared to eventual title winners McLaren and Williams' 1997 title-rivals Ferrari. Frentzen would start the season with a podium at Albert Park, however this would be the highlight of Frentzen's year. He was unable to repeat the podium, and was once again out-performed by team mate Jacques Villenuve. Frentzen finished the season placed 7th in the championship with 17 points. Frentzen would depart Williams during the off-season after two difficult years, with the time considered disappointing due to difficulty adjusting to the different atmosphere at Williams compared to Sauber and disagreements with head engineer Patrick Head.

Jordan (1999–mid 2001) and Prost (mid 2001)

In 1999 Frentzen moved to Jordan in a straight swap with Ralf Schumacher and enjoyed success in the Mugen-Honda powered car, with two race wins and scoring points in the majority of races. During the 1999 European Grand Prix he was leading after a pole position and with both Häkkinen and Irvine outside of the points (Häkkinen because he pitted for wets during a very very short shower period and Irvine because of a very slow pit stop where the rear right tyre was not ready in time) and with both outside the points and equal on 60 points and with him on 50, if positions wouldn't change, he would be equal on points with both Häkkinen and Irvine with 2 races to go. But on the 32nd lap, his Jordan stopped. Häkkinen went on to recover and finish 5th. Before the 1999 Malaysian Grand Prix he was 12 points behind championship leader Häkkinen. But his title dreams were dashed on that race, with Frentzen finishing 6th, with Häkkinen and Irvine finishing 3rd and 1st respectively. With 1 race to go (and 10 points still available for drivers) Frentzen had 51 points, 19 less than championship leader Irvine. Frentzen finished third in the Driver Championship (22 points behind the world champion Mika Häkkinen and was regarded by many as the driver of the year. After the strong season Frentzen was considered as a favourite to challenge for the championship in 2000.

2000 and 2001 were critical years as Honda also began to supply the BAR team, resulting in a race between the teams as to who would secure the regular engine supply. In 2000 Frentzen managed two podiums, which were the best results for the team, but Jordan still finished down the grid and, crucially, behind BAR. After some low points finishes, injury, disagreements about the technical direction of the team (Frentzen reportedly offered to pay for the changes to fix the car, out of his own pocket) and then a string of retirements halfway through the 2001 season, Jordan sacked Frentzen and replaced him with Jean Alesi. Eight years later Eddie Jordan revealed that the termination of Frentzen's contract was a move to appease Honda and sign the Japanese driver Takuma Sato to race for the team. Frentzen subsequently took Alesi's place at the struggling Prost team, and managed to qualify fourth at Spa, before the outfit collapsed financially at the end of the season.

Arrows (2002) and return to Sauber (2002–03)

2002 saw Frentzen drive for the Arrows team. He scored points on two occasions and outpaced both the Jaguars who ran the same engine. But the team went bankrupt in August and Frentzen was released from his contract. Back with Sauber for 2003, after a one-off drive replacing Felipe Massa at the 2002 United States Grand Prix, Frentzen was evenly matched with his highly rated teammate Nick Heidfeld and scored a podium finish in the penultimate race of the year in the United States.

DTM

For 2004, Frentzen moved to the German Deutsche Tourenwagen Masters saloon car series to drive for Opel, encouraged by the success achieved in the series by fellow F1 refugee Jean Alesi. However, his Opel Vectra was not a competitive car, and he was regularly outpaced by not only the Audi and Mercedes drivers but also by his Opel teammates, eventually finishing the season 14th in the championship standings. However he remained in the DTM with Opel for the 2005 season and finished the year in 8th as best-placed Opel driver, with his best result a 3rd place from pole position at Brno in the Czech Republic.

After Opel withdrew after the 2005 season, Frentzen joined Audi for 2006. He would finish 3rd at the first race of the season at Hockenheim and again at the 8th race of the season at Barcelona. Frentzen finished the season 7th in the final standings and quit the team stating he had "no support from the team".

Later career

In April 2008, Frentzen drove the Bahrain race in the Speedcar Series of the 2007/2008 season and later on joined the Speedcar Series for the complete 2008/2009 season.

He competed in the 24 Hours of Le Mans for Aston Martin Racing driving one of the two factory Aston Martin DBR9s with Karl Wendlinger and Andrea Piccini in the GT1 class. His team finished 4th in class and 16th overall.

Also in 2008, Frentzen built the HHF Hybrid Concept Car which he entered in the 24 Hours Nürburgring with his own team. The chassis was a bought Gumpert Apollo road car with a 3.3 litre V8 bi-turbo with 520 hp and an electric motor with approximately 136 hp. Frentzen finished the race but was not classified due to two conventional gearbox failures.

In 2011, Frentzen won a special one-off "ROC Legends" race against Hans-Joachim Stuck, Marc Duez and Stig Blomqvist as part of the 2011 Race of Champions.

In 2012, Frentzen competed in the ADAC GT Masters season with a Callaway Competition Corvette Z06, and returned to the series in 2014 with a HTP Motorsport Mercedes-Benz SLS AMG GT3.

Driving style and appraisal
Frentzen has been described as a "loyal" driver. The monthly magazine F1 Racing noted that the key issue for Frentzen was finding the appropriate settings for his car which was done by himself. In his autobiography An Independent Man, Eddie Jordan said that Frentzen did a "great job" at driving the Jordan 199. After leaving Sauber at the end of 2003, BBC Sport described Frentzen as a driver who "never quite made the most of a brilliant natural talent." However, Sauber team principal Peter Sauber said in 2005 that Frentzen was the most important driver for his team but admitted that the driver needed to work in a specific atmosphere and referred to his time at Williams where he was in conflict with technical director Patrick Head.

Other notable appearances
Frentzen appeared on an episode in the 29th series of British motoring show Top Gear in 2020, in which he appeared as a rival for the presenters in a Germany versus Britain challenge.

Racing record

Career summary

Complete International Formula 3000 results
(key) (Races in bold indicate pole position) (Races
in italics indicate fastest lap)

Complete Japanese Formula 3000 results
(key) (Races in bold indicate pole position) (Races in italics indicate fastest lap)

Complete Formula One results
(key) (races in bold indicate pole position; races in italics indicate fastest lap)

† Did not finish, but was classified as he had completed more than 90% of the race distance.

Complete Deutsche Tourenwagen Meisterschaft/Masters results
(key) (Races in bold indicate pole position) (Races in italics indicate fastest lap)

 A non-championship one-off race was held in 2004 at the streets of Shanghai, China.

Complete 24 Hours of Le Mans results

References

External links

 
 Hybrid Racing AG Official website

1967 births
Living people
Sportspeople from Mönchengladbach
German racing drivers
German Formula One drivers
Sauber Formula One drivers
Williams Formula One drivers
Jordan Formula One drivers
Prost Formula One drivers
Arrows Formula One drivers
Formula One race winners
Japanese Formula 3000 Championship drivers
Deutsche Tourenwagen Masters drivers
24 Hours of Le Mans drivers
German Formula Three Championship drivers
German people of Spanish descent
German expatriates in Monaco
International Formula 3000 drivers
Speedcar Series drivers
Racing drivers from North Rhine-Westphalia
World Sportscar Championship drivers
ADAC GT Masters drivers
Aston Martin Racing drivers
Phoenix Racing drivers
Mercedes-AMG Motorsport drivers
Audi Sport drivers
Abt Sportsline drivers
Alan Docking Racing drivers
Nürburgring 24 Hours drivers